The Grand Canyon North Rim Headquarters is a historic district on the North Rim of the Grand Canyon in Grand Canyon National Park, Arizona.  Established from 1926 through the 1930s, the district includes examples of rustic architecture as applied to employee residences, administrative facilities and service structures.

History
The North Rim experienced very little development until 1926, in part due to the intervention of Senator Ralph Cameron, who held commercial interests in the park area prior to its establishment, and who prevented funding of North Rim improvements.

Starting in 1926, the first structures included the Ranger Residence and the accompanying wood shed and horse barn. Additional structures were added during the late 1920s and 1930s, including various equipment storage areas, warehouses, and residences. The last structure to be constructed as part of the North Rim Headquarters was an equipment shed in 1936.

Over the years, the use of these buildings has changed considerably, however, in most instances, these changes do not affect the exterior of the structure. The most significant architectural qualities are limited to the exterior facades, the fireplace in Residence No. 102, and to the wrought iron door hinges on several of the maintenance buildings.

Description
The district comprises two sections, each with residences. The eastern portion includes a garage and a ranger station, while the western group includes an office, a barn and maintenance buildings.

The oldest structure, a residence, is a one-story gable-roofed structure, built in frame on a stone foundation with lap siding in 1926. Other houses, sheds and a dormitory were built in 1931. The dormitory is particularly notable for its expression of the rustic style. A ranger station, also known as the old administration building, was built in 1931 and moved in the mid-1930s, but was destroyed by fire on March 5, 1982.

Other buildings include a machine shop (1932), gas and oil station (1933) and a variety of residences.

Historic designation
The Grand Canyon North Rim Headquarters District was placed on the National Register of Historic Places on September 2, 1982.

See also
North Rim of the Grand Canyon
Architects of the National Park Service
Buildings and structures in Grand Canyon National Park
National Register of Historic Places listings in Grand Canyon National Park

References

External links

North Rim Headquarters
Historic districts on the National Register of Historic Places in Arizona
Government buildings completed in 1926
National Register of Historic Places in Coconino County, Arizona
Park buildings and structures on the National Register of Historic Places in Arizona
1926 establishments in Arizona
Buildings and structures in Coconino County, Arizona
Civilian Conservation Corps in Arizona
Rustic architecture in Arizona
Historic American Buildings Survey in Arizona
National Register of Historic Places in Grand Canyon National Park